Dhaniram Paudel (1965/1966 – June 14, 2019) was a Nepalese politician.

Paudel was appointed Minister without Portfolio in the national government in August 2016, one of five new ministers appointed from the Communist Party of Nepal (Maoist-Centre).

Paudel died on 14 June 2019 at his residence in Chitwan due to a heart attack.

References

Government ministers of Nepal
Communist Party of Nepal (Maoist Centre)
1960s births
2019 deaths